Akrout is a surname. Notable people with the surname include:

Edward Akrout (born 1982), British-French artist and actor
Youssef Akrout (born 1990), Tunisian sailor